Elections to Hyndburn Council (Lancashire, England) were held on 5 May 1996. One third of the council was up for election.

References

1996 English local elections
1996
1990s in Lancashire